Cappy may refer to:

Places
 Cappy, Somme, a commune of the Somme département, France
 Cappy, a townland in County Fermanagh, Northern Ireland

People
 Ralph Cappy (1943–2009), Chief Justice of the Supreme Court of Pennsylvania
 Cappy Thompson (born 1952), American artist in the medium of glass
 nickname of Fred Capossela (1902–1991), American thoroughbred race track announcer
 nickname of Franklin Cappon (1900–1961), American college football and basketball player and coach
 nickname of Cara Capuano, American sports reporter and television sports anchor
 nickname of Catharine Bond Hill, American economics professor and current president of Vassar College
 nickname of W. H. Lillard (1881–1967), American football coach and educator

Characters
 Cappy (Robots), a character in the 2005 film Robots
 Cappy (Kirby), a type of monster in the Kirby video games
 Cappy, in the anime series Hamtaro
 Cappy, a minor character in the TV series Twin Peaks — see List of Twin Peaks characters
 Cappy, a hat  character in the video game Super Mario Odyssey

Other uses
 Cappy (juice), a brand of juices produced and commercialized by the Coca-Cola Company in Eastern Europe

See also
 Cappie (disambiguation)
 Cap (nickname)

Lists of people by nickname